The 2015 Tour of Slovenia was the 22nd edition of the Tour of Slovenia cycling stage race. It was scheduled from 18 to 21 June.

The winner of the overall classification was Primož Roglič, having taken the race lead on the penultimate stage to the Trije Kralji Ski Resort.

Schedule

Teams

UCI ProTeams

UCI Professional Continental Teams

UCI Continental Teams

National team
 Slovenia

Stages

Stage 1

18 June 2015 — Ljubljana to Ljubljana, individual time trial (ITT)

Stage 2
19 June 2015 — Škofja Loka to Kočevje,

Stage 3
20 June 2015 — Dobrovnik to Trije Kralji Ski Resort,

Stage 4
21 June 2015 — Rogaška Slatina to Novo Mesto,

Classification leadership

Final standings

General classification

Young rider classification

Points classification

Mountains classification

Teams classification

Notes

References

External links

Tour of Slovenia
Tour of Slovenia
2015 in Slovenian sport